Microorchidism is a genetic disorder found in males, characterized by abnormally small testes; it is the opposite of macroorchidism, which is characterized by abnormally large testes. The condition is associated with (and often secondary to) a number of other genetic disorders, including Klinefelter's Syndrome and Prader-Willi syndrome, as well as other multiple malformation disorders. The degree of abnormality (or otherwise) of the testes can be determined by the use of an orchidometer. In addition, Microorchidism may also occur as a result of shrinkage or atrophy of the testis due to infections like mumps. It is distinct from testicular atrophy caused as a result of hormone therapy or injury.

See also 
 Endocrine system
 Orchitis

References 

Congenital disorders of male genital organs
Genetic disorders with no OMIM